Rick Draney is a former wheelchair tennis and wheelchair rugby player. In wheelchair tennis, he competed in the Quad division of the sport. 

Draney became involved with wheelchair tennis in 1984. He was instrumental in the development of the quad division in the United States.

Draney has a long list of accomplishments to his name: 20 singles and doubles titles at the U.S. Open and British Open wheelchair tennis tournaments, as well as gold medals at the 1993 International Stoke Mandeville Games, the 1995 U.S. Olympic Festival, and the 1998 and 2003 World Team Cups. During his career, and after the International Tennis Federation established the Quad division, Draney achieved the world number 1 ranking in both singles and doubles. Towards the end of his competitive career, Draney partnered David Wagner, whom he had introduced to wheelchair tennis a few years earlier, to victory at the British Open in July 2002. They also finished as runners-up at the 2003 Wheelchair Tennis Doubles Masters.

In 2012, Draney was the recipient of the USTA Brad Parks award, an award given annually by the United States Tennis Association to an individual or group involved with wheelchair tennis, in recognition of outstanding contribution to the sport. Draney has been organizing and participating in wheelchair tennis clinics, introducing the sport of wheelchair tennis to people with injuries and disabilities since the 1980s. In January 2018, the ITF announced that Draney would be the recipient of the 2017 ITF Brad Parks award.

In wheelchair rugby, Draney earned a gold medal with Team USA at the 1994 World Championships and a gold at the 2000 Paralympics in Sydney. He was induced into the International Tennis Hall of Fame in 2023.

References 

Living people
Wheelchair tennis players
International Tennis Hall of Fame inductees
American wheelchair rugby players
Year of birth missing (living people)